Agustina is a given name, a feminine version of Augustine. It is a name popular in Argentina, Indonesia, and Uruguay. It may refer to:
 Agustina de Aragón (1786–1857), Spanish heroine
 Agustina Bessa-Luís (1922-2019), Portuguese writer
 Agustina Cherri (born 1983), Argentine actress, dancer and model
 Agustina García (born 1981), field hockey player
 Agustina Palacio de Libarona (1825-1880), Argentine writer, storyteller, heroine
 Agustina Roth (born 2001), BMX rider

See also 
 Agustin
 Agustini
 Agustino
 Augustin
 Augustina
 Augustine
 Augustini
 Augustino

References 

Feminine given names
Spanish feminine given names